Whichcord is a surname. Notable people with the surname include:

 Claire Whichcord (born 1972), British cricketer
 John Whichcord Sr. (1790–1860), British architect
 John Whichcord Jr. (1823–1885), British architect